St Joseph College (Dutch: Sint-Jozefcollege) is a Roman Catholic secondary school in Turnhout, Belgium. It was founded by the Society of Jesus in 1845 and was rebuilt in the same style as Xaverius College in Borgerhout.

History
As early as 1639, there was a Latin school in the area. This lasted until the 1796 and the Napoleonic wars.

In 1845 a landowner, Maria de Nef, asked the Jesuits to take over the school. It was re-established as the Collegium Sancti Josephi Turnholtanum. Over the following 90 years, its campus grew in size to accommodate the increasing student population. In 1935, a new school was built on a 22-acre site on the outskirts of the city. In 1941, this was expanded and in 1958 a new primary school was built.

Originally, it only taught Greek and Latin. In 1959, sciences were introduced and in 1985 it became co-educational.

Alumni
Notable former students include:

Paul Stoffels

Gallery

See also
 List of Jesuit sites in Belgium
 Xaverius College
 Diocese of Antwerp

References

External links
St Joseph College site

Turnhout
Jesuit secondary schools in Belgium
Educational institutions established in 1845